Susan Lilian Primrose Cunliffe-Lister, Countess of Swinton, Baroness Masham of Ilton,  (14 April 1935 – 12 March 2023) was a British crossbench member of the House of Lords, disability campaigner and Paralympic athlete. She was Vice President of the Snowdon Trust, founded by the Earl of Snowdon, which provides grants and scholarships for students with disabilities. Her 53 years' membership of the House of Lords was the longest of any female peer.

Personal life
Susan Sinclair was born on 14 April 1935, as the daughter of Major Sir Ronald Sinclair, 8th Baronet. She was educated at Heathfield School and London Polytechnic (the Royal Polytechnic Institution).

In 1959 she married David Cunliffe-Lister, Lord Masham (1937–2006), who became Earl of Swinton in 1972. By this marriage, she became entitled to the honorifics Lady Masham, and, later, Countess of Swinton. She was created a life peer in 1970 as the Baroness Masham of Ilton, of Masham in the North Riding of the County of York.

She was a prominent Roman Catholic convert and a patron of the Margaret Beaufort Institute of Theology.

She and her husband (who died in 2006) adopted two children, Clare and Jessie. 

She died on 12 March 2023, at the age of 87.

Disability campaigner 
Cunliffe-Lister was disabled in a riding accident in 1958, and subsequently became a champion for causes related to disability.  She was the subject of This Is Your Life in February 1976 when she was surprised by Eamonn Andrews in the foyer of the De Vere hotel in Kensington, London. 

Cunliffe-Lister was an active member of the House of Lords, where she continued to be known as the Baroness Masham of Ilton, a title she held in her own right. She took a particular interest in issues surrounding disability, health and penal reform. She opened the factory for Nordis Signs, part of the Kier Group, in Northampton, which employs a majority-disabled workforce.
She continued to run the Masham Riding Centre in Masham, North Yorkshire until her death. In 2011, she was awarded an Honorary Fellowship by the Royal College of Nursing.

Cunliffe-Lister was a longtime supporter of the charity Disability Action Yorkshire, becoming Patron in 2011.

Cunliffe-Lister was the founder of the Spinal Injuries Association, of which she was president.

Paralympic career
Cunliffe-Lister competed in several Paralympic Games. At the inaugural Games in Rome in 1960, she won swimming gold and silver in the 25m breaststroke complete class 2 and 25m backstroke complete class 2 respectively, as well as bronze in the table tennis, women's doubles class B.

Four years later, at the 1964 Tokyo Paralympics, she won gold in the table tennis women's doubles B alongside Gwen Buck, and silver in the women's singles B. In the pool, Masham won three silver medals, in the 25m freestyle prone complete C2, 25m freestyle supine complete C2, and 25m breaststroke complete C2.

At the 1968 Tel Aviv Paralympics, Masham added table tennis silver in the women's doubles B with Buck, and bronze in the women's singles B.

References

Sources
 
 Masham Riding Centre 
 2nd Earl of Swinton, DL (1937-2006) – Google Peerage News Group

External links

House of Lords profile

1935 births
2023 deaths
Alumni of the University of Westminster
Swinton
British Roman Catholics
Susan
Converts to Roman Catholicism
Crossbench life peers
Dames of St. Gregory the Great
Daughters of baronets
Deputy Lieutenants of the North Riding of Yorkshire
English female swimmers
English female table tennis players
English people with disabilities
Honorary Fellows of the Royal College of Nursing
Life peeresses created by Elizabeth II
Masham, Susan
Masham, Susan
Masham, Susan
Masham, Susan
Masham, Susan
Masham, Susan
Masham, Susan
Masham, Susan
Masham, Susan
Masham, Susan
People educated at Heathfield School, Ascot
People from Masham
People with paraplegia
Place of birth missing
Royalty and nobility with disabilities
Masham, Susan
Masham, Susan
Masham, Susan
Masham, Susan
Masham, Susan
Masham, Susan